Bromst is the second studio album by the American electronic musician Dan Deacon. It was released on March 24, 2009.

Background 
According to Deacon: "Spiderman of the Rings was very carefree and youthful – sort of partying for the sake of partying. This record is less about a party and more about a celebration." In an interview broadcast on NPR's Talk of the Nation on April 22, 2009, Deacon stated that the word "Bromst" had no meaning other than being the title of the album.

In an interview with The A.V. Club, Deacon discusses the composition and lyrical content of the album: "The music itself is very much about cycles, time, and what happens after life, becoming a ghost and stuff like that… The lyrical content is about the future. I think there is going to be a large paradigm shift in a few years, and it could either be to a new age of enlightenment and unity... or it could be a return to a dark age of kings and mass, open oppression followed by a die-off of human culture."

Recording process 
While many of the sounds in Bromst are computer generated, much of it was recorded using live instruments.  The album was produced by Chester Gwazda and tracked mainly in Baltimore and was mixed at SnowGhost Studio in Whitefish, Montana.

For a few of the tracks on Bromst, Deacon uses a player piano. The piano had to be re-wired so that each line was tracked individually, so the piano could keep up with what Deacon composed, which engineer Brett Allen claims to be impossibly fast to play on one piano.

Live
On December 11, 2008, Deacon performed many of the songs from Bromst with an ensemble of live performers at the Masonic Temple in Brooklyn, New York.
The lineup of the ensemble was:

Percussion:
 Eric Beach (So Percussion)
 Denny Bowen (Double Dagger, Roomrunner, Smart Growth)
 Jeremy Hyman (Ponytail, Ultimate Reality)
 Kevin O'Meara (Videohippos, Ultimate Reality)
 Rich O'Meara (ko'mm)
 Josh Quillen (So Percussion)
 Adam Sliwinski (So Percussion)
 Jason Treuting (So Percussion)
 Max Eilbacher (Needle Gun, Teeth Mountain)

Synthesizers, keyboards, and electronics:
 Benny Boeldt (Adventure)
 William Cashion (Future Islands)
 Dan Deacon
 Chester Gwazda (Nuclear Power Pants)
 Gerrit Welmers (Future Islands)

Guitars:
 Matt Papiach (Ecstatic Sunshine, White Williams)
 Ken Seeno (Ponytail)

Deacon embarked on a North American tour in the spring of 2009 where he performed with a 14-piece band, similar to the one above.

Reception
Nitsuh Abebe of Pitchfork praised the album, awarding it with Best New Music. Comparing the album to Deacon’s Spiderman of the Rings, Abebe writes of Bromst: "The palette is richer, the samples smoother, the space larger, the programming slightly less buzzy."

Track listing 
 "Build Voice" – 5:28
 "Red F" – 4:38
 "Paddling Ghost" – 4:05
 "Snookered" – 8:04
 "Of the Mountains" – 7:16
 "Surprise Stefani" – 7:46
 "Wet Wings" – 2:53
 "Woof Woof" – 4:44
 "Slow With Horns / Run for Your Life" – 6:35
 "Baltihorse" – 6:21
 "Get Older" – 6:30
 "Kalimidiba (iTunes Bonus Track) – 2:40

Personnel 
 Dan Deacon – electronics, vocals, trombone, drums
 Chester Gwazda – Keyboards
 Kevin O'Meara – Mallets, Drums
 Rich O'Meara – Mallets
 Jeremy Hyman – Drums
 Andy Abelow – Alto Saxophone
 Connor Kizer – Trumpet
 Matt Papiach – Guitar
 Jana Hunter – Vocals on "Wet Wings"

References 

2009 albums
Dan Deacon albums
Carpark Records albums
Noise pop albums
Indietronica albums